Lombardy renewed its delegation to the Italian Senate on April 9, 2006. This election was a part of national Italian general election of 2006 even if, according to the Italian Constitution, every senatorial challenge in each Region is a single and independent race.

Differently from the national result, the election was won by the centre-right coalition of the House of Freedoms. Forza Italia was the largest party in the election with 28%, ahead of the Democrats of the Left (12%) and Lega Nord (11%). Eleven provinces gave a majority or a plurality to Silvio Berlusconi's alliance, while voters of the Province of Mantua supported the new Prime Minister of Italy Romano Prodi.

Background
Silvio Berlusconi's House of Freedoms arrived to this election after a series of bad results. Forza Italia had lost 5 points at regional level during the 2004 European election, while the Province of Milan shifted to the left in the same occasion. 2005 regional election had confirmed centre-right Regional President Roberto Formigoni, but its coalition lost more than 8 points.

On the other side, in 2005 Romano Prodi had launched his new larger coalition, The Union, merging in a single alliance quite all oppositions to Berlusconi's majority: The Olive Tree, the Communist Refoundation Party and Antonio Di Pietro's Italy of Values, which in Lombardy were joined by the Lombard Autonomy League.

Electoral law
The new electoral law for the Senate was established in 2005 by the Calderoli Law, and it is a form of semi-proportional representation. A party presents its own closed list and it can join other parties in alliances. The coalition which receives a plurality automatically wins at least 26 seats. Respecting this condition, seats are divided between coalitions, and subsequently to party lists, using the largest remainder method with a Hare quota. To receive seats, a party must overcome the barrage of 8% of the vote if it contests a single race, or of 3% of the vote if it runs in alliance.

Results

|-
|- bgcolor="#E9E9E9"
!rowspan="1" align="left" valign="top"|Coalition leader
!rowspan="1" align="center" valign="top"|votes
!rowspan="1" align="center" valign="top"|votes (%)
!rowspan="1" align="center" valign="top"|seats
!rowspan="1" align="left" valign="top"|Party
!rowspan="1" align="center" valign="top"|votes
!rowspan="1" align="center" valign="top"|votes (%)
!rowspan="1" align="center" valign="top"|seats
!rowspan="1" align="center" valign="top"|change
|-
!rowspan="5" align="left" valign="top"|Silvio Berlusconi
|rowspan="5" valign="top"|3,342,468
|rowspan="5" valign="top"|57.0
|rowspan="5" valign="top"|27

|align="left"|Forza Italia
|valign="top"|1,623,745
|valign="top"|27.7
|valign="top"|14
|valign="top"|-1
|-
|align="left"|Lega Nord
|valign="top"|652,047
|valign="top"|11.1
|valign="top"|5
|valign="top"|-4
|-
|align="left"|National Alliance
|valign="top"|572,242
|valign="top"|9.8
|valign="top"|5
|valign="top"|-2
|-
|align="left"|Union of Christian and Centre Democrats
|valign="top"|343,269
|valign="top"|5.9
|valign="top"|3
|valign="top"|+2
|-
|align="left"|Others
|valign="top"|151,165
|valign="top"|2.5
|valign="top"|-
|valign="top"|-1

|-
!rowspan="7" align="left" valign="top"|Romano Prodi
|rowspan="7" valign="top"|2,501,467
|rowspan="7" valign="top"|42.6
|rowspan="7" valign="top"|20

|align="left"|Democrats of the Left
|valign="top"|726,105
|valign="top"|12.4
|valign="top"|7
|valign="top"|+3
|-
|align="left"|Democracy is Freedom – The Daisy
|valign="top"|588,856
|valign="top"|10.0
|valign="top"|6
|valign="top"|+2
|-
|align="left"|Communist Refoundation Party
|valign="top"|407,939
|valign="top"|7.0
|valign="top"|4
|valign="top"|+3
|-
|align="left"|Together with the Union
|valign="top"|588,856
|valign="top"|4.8
|valign="top"|3
|valign="top"|=
|-
|align="left"|Italy of Values
|valign="top"|150,116
|valign="top"|2.6
|valign="top"|-
|valign="top"|-1
|-
|align="left"|Rose in the Fist
|valign="top"|128,849
|valign="top"|2.2
|valign="top"|-
|valign="top"|-
|-
|align="left"|Others
|valign="top"|220,050
|valign="top"|3.8
|valign="top"|-
|valign="top"|-1

|-
!rowspan="1" align="left" valign="top"|Others
|rowspan="1" valign="top"|25,193
|rowspan="1" valign="top"|0.4
|rowspan="1" valign="top"|-

|align="left"|Others
|valign="top"|25,193
|valign="top"|0.4
|valign="top"|-
|valign="top"|-

|-
|- bgcolor="#E9E9E9"
!rowspan="1" align="left" valign="top"|Total coalitions
!rowspan="1" align="right" valign="top"|5,869,128
!rowspan="1" align="right" valign="top"|100.0
!rowspan="1" align="right" valign="top"|47
!rowspan="1" align="left" valign="top"|Total parties
!rowspan="1" align="right" valign="top"|5,869,128
!rowspan="1" align="right" valign="top"|100.0
!rowspan="1" align="right" valign="top"|47
!rowspan="1" align="right" valign="top"|=
|}
Source: Ministry of the Interior

Lombard delegation to Senate

Forza Italia
 Roberto Formigoni
  Obliged to resign on July 12. Substituted by Antonio Del Pennino.
 Guido Possa
 Ombretta Colli
 Gianfranco Rotondi
 Gianpiero Carlo Cantoni
 Marcello Dell'Utri
 Antonio Tomassini
 Nitto Francesco Palma
 Luigi Scotti
 Romano Comincioli
 Luigi Grillo
 Enrico Pianetta
 Valerio Carrara    
 Egidio Sterpa

Democrats of the Left
 Gerardo D'Ambrosio
 Fiorenza Bassoli
 Furio Colombo
 Carlo Fontana
 Paolo Bodini
 Guido Galardi
 Giorgio Roilo

The Daisy
 Paolo Binetti
 Valerio Zanone
 Emanuela Baio
 Franco Danieli
 Daniele Bosone
 Paolo Rossi

Lega Nord
 Roberto Castelli
 Giuseppe Leoni
 Ettore Pietro Pirovano
 Dario Galli
 Dario Fruscio

National Alliance
 Alfredo Mantica
 Alessio Butti
 Giuseppe Valditara
 Stefano Losurdo
 Antonino Caruso

Communist Refoundation Party
 Maria Luisa Boccia
 Giovanna Capelli
 Giovanni Confalonieri
 Josè Luiz Del Roio

Union of Christian and Centre Democrats
 Rocco Buttiglione
 Graziano Maffioli
 Luigi Maninetti

Together with the Union
 Natale Ripamonti
 Maria Agostina Pellagatta
 Gianpaolo Silvestri
Source: Italian Senate

References

Elections in Lombardy
2006 elections in Italy